Chhapar is a small town and a municipality in Churu district in the state of Rajasthan, India.
Chhapar and Tal chhapar is located in the Churu district of Northwestern Rajasthan in the Shekhawati region of India. It is 210 km from Jaipur and situated on the road from Ratangarh to Sujangarh. The Tal Chappar lies in the Sujangarh Tehsil of Churu district. It lies on the Nokha-Sujangarh state highway and is situated at a distance of 85 km from Churu and about 132 km from Bikaner. The nearest railway station is Chappar which lies on Degana-Churu-Rewari broad gauge line of Northern Western Railways. The nearest Airport is Jaipur International Airport (Sanganer) which is at a distance of 215 km from Chappar. It is known for black bucks but it is also home to a variety of birds. Here is a famous sanctuary known as Tal Chhapar Sanctuary

The Tal Chhapar Sanctuary is located on the fringe of the Great Indian Desert. Tal Chhapar nestles a unique refuge of the most elegant antelope encountered in India, "the Black buck". Tal Chhaper sanctuary, with almost flat tract and interspersed shallow, low-lying areas, has open grassland with scattered Acacia and prosopis trees which give it an appearance of a typical Savanna. The word "Tal" means plane land. The rain water flows through shallow, low-lying areas and collect in the small seasonal water ponds.

The geology of the zone is obscured by the wind blown over-burden. Some small hillocks and exposed rocks of slate and quartzite are found in the western side of the sanctuary. Area between hillocks and the sanctuary constitutes the watershed area of the sanctuary. The whole sanctuary used to be flooded by water during the heavy rains but with salt mining going on, rain water from the hillocks hardly reaches the sanctuary.

Geography 
The sanctuary is named after Chhapar village which is located at 27°-50' North and 74°-25' East. It is a flat saline depression locally known as "Tal" that has a unique ecosystem in the heart of the Thar Desert, Perched at a height of 302 meters (990 feet) above sea level.

Demographics 
Chhapar is a Municipality city in district of Churu, Rajasthan. The Chhapar city is divided into 20 wards for which elections are held every 5 years. The Chhapar Municipality has population of 19,744 of which 10,066 are males while 9,678 are females as per report released by Census India 2011. 

Population of Children with age of 0-6 is 2985 which is 15.12 % of total population of Chhapar (M). In Chhapar Municipality, Female Sex Ratio is of 961 against state average of 928. Moreover Child Sex Ratio in Chhapar is around 871 compared to Rajasthan state average of 888. Literacy rate of Chhapar city is 68.61 % higher than state average of 66.11 %. In Chhapar, Male literacy is around 79.93 % while female literacy rate is 57.05 %.

Roads 

Chhapar is well connected by roads with almost all major cities of Rajasthan and New Delhi. National Highway 65 passes through Chhapar that connects it to Jodhpur and Chandigarh. Other than this, Rajasthan Mega Highway also passes from the town which connects it to Ajmer and Hanumangarh. The direct bus service is available for Delhi, Surat, Ahmedabad, Udaipur, Jodhpur, Jaipur, Kota, Ajmer, Bikaner, Ganganagar, Hisar, Roorkee, Haridwar, Indore, Ludhiana and many other near and far towns.

Heritage on Wheels: Tal Chhapar/ Shekhawati

The next destination of the Heritage on Wheels sojourn is Shekhawati region. Shekhawati is one of the richest regions, in terms of art and crafts, of Rajasthan. Creating beautiful images with vibrant colors is a way of life of the artists of the Shekhawati region. The best exponents of Shekhawati art and paintings are the Havelis of the Shekhawati. Mandawa and Nawalgarh display some of the best Shekhawati paintings on the walls of their Havelis.

The same artistic tradition of frescoes is visible in other less known towns of the Shekhawati region. It is just amazing to see the plethora of murals in a land otherwise known as impoverished desert. Besides the tour of various places of Shekhawati, you will be taken to the Tal Chappar Wildlife Sanctuary as well. It is all because of The Tal Chhapar Sanctuary, and is famous for its black bucks. It is a flat saline depression, with a unique ecosystem. During September, the Tal Chappar wild life sanctuary comes alive with the chirping of various migratory birds including montagur's, marsh harrier, pale harrier, imperial eagle, tawny eagle, short toed eagle, sparrow hawk, skylark, crested lark, ring drove, brown dove, blue jay, green bee eaters, black ibis and demoiselle cranes.

Schools, Colleges, Hospitals, Banks, Dharamshalas, Mandir and mosque 

Schools
Boys High Secondary School
Girls High secondary School
Saraswati Vidha Mandir Madhaymik Vidhalay, Chhapar
Tolaram Bhansali Bal Vidya Mandir
Adarsh Vidya Mandir Secondary School
Adarsh Vidya Mandir P
ary School
Anuvrat Vidya Mandir
Shri Ram Bal Vidya Mandir
Tagore Public School
Marudhar Sikshan Sansthan
Vivekanand Sikshan Sansthan
Ramgopal Periwal Middle School
Govt.primary School No-1
Govt.primary School No-2
Govt.primary School No-3
Govt.primary Girls School
zakir husen shikchhan sansthan

References 

Cities and towns in Churu district